Mon village à l'heure allemande  is a novel by Jean-Louis Bory published in 1945, which won the Prix Goncourt the same year.

Editions 
Mon village à l'heure allemande , Groupe Flammarion, Paris, 1945.

References

1945 French novels
Prix Goncourt winning works